Scum of the Earth is a 1974 American horror film which was directed and produced by S.F. Brownrigg. It was also known as Poor White Trash Part II.

Cast
Gene Ross - Odis Pickett 
Ann Stafford - Emmy Pickett 
Norma Moore - Helen Fraser 
Camilla Carr - Sarah Pickett 
Charlie Dell - Bo Pickett 
Hugh Feagin - Jim 
Joel Colodner - Paul Fraser

Production
The film was made under the working title, Death is a Family Affair.

See also
 List of American films of 1974

References

External links

Scum of the Earth at Grindhouse Database

1974 films
American exploitation films
American horror films
1974 horror films
Dimension Pictures films
1970s English-language films
1970s American films